Leccinum cyaneobasileucum is a species of bolete fungus in the family Boletaceae. Originally found growing under silver birch, it was described as new to science in 1991. In deposit the spores are walnut brown; microscopically, they are somewhat spindle shaped and measure 14–18 by 5–6 µm. L. cyaneobasileucum grows under birch, usually in moss. The mushroom is edible but not particularly tasty.

See also
List of Leccinum species

References

cyaneobasileucum
Fungi described in 1991
Fungi of Europe